Bosnia and Herzegovina–Romania relations are foreign relations between Romania and Bosnia and Herzegovina . Both countries are full members of the Southeast European Cooperation Process, of the Southeast European Cooperative Initiative, and of the Stability Pact for South Eastern Europe. Bosnia and Herzegovina  has an embassy in Bucharest. Romania has an embassy in Sarajevo.

History

Romania recognized Bosnia and Herzegovina's independence on March 1, 1996, both countries established diplomatic relations on the same day. Relations were described as "excellent" by the foreign ministers in 2006, ahead of the opening of the Bosnian embassy in Bucharest.

They entered into a free trade agreement in April 2003, which Romania withdrew from following its entry into the European Union in 2007. President Traian Băsescu of Romania made an official visit to Bosnia and Herzegovina in March 2008. Romania has argued against any rapid withdrawal of troops from Bosnia, and supports Bosnian entry into the EU.

Military cooperation
Romania contributed 200 soldiers to a non-combat Engineering Battalion of IFOR/SFOR in the wake of the Bosnian conflict in the mid-90s, four helicopters to the EUFOR operation between 2005 and 2006, and 85 police to the EU mission between 2003 and 2006. The countries signed a military cooperation plan in 2006.

Human trafficking
Police raids of Bosnian brothels in 2001 found that many of the women had been trafficked from Romania, and they were offered repatriation. The UN confirmed that Romanian officers were investigated for possible collusion in the sex trafficking. Further raids in 2002 were organised by the Southeast European Cooperative Initiative in Bucharest, Romania.

See also 
 Foreign relations of Bosnia and Herzegovina
 Foreign relations of Romania
 Accession of Bosnia and Herzegovina to the European Union
 Romania–Yugoslavia relations

References

External links 
  Romanian Ministry of Foreign Affairs: direction of the Romanian embassy in Sarajevo
  Romanian Ministry of Foreign Affairs: direction of the Bosnian embassy in Bucharest

 
Romania 
Bilateral relations of Romania